Oxynoemacheilus simavicus, the Simav loach, is a species of stone loach from the genus Oxynoemacheilus. It is endemic to a single stream, the Simav, which is a tributary of the Gediz in western Anatolia, Turkey. The populations has declined and this is caused by threats such as pollution and extraction of water leading to an evaluation of this species conservation status by the IUCN as Critically Endangered.

References

simavicus
Fish described in 1978
Taxa named by Süleyman Balık
Taxa named by Petre Mihai Bănărescu
Endemic fauna of Turkey